Narasimham is a 2000 Indian Malayalam-language action drama film directed by Shaji Kailas and written by Ranjith. The film stars Mohanlal in the title role with Thilakan, N. F. Varghese, Aishwariyaa Bhaskaran and Jagathy Sreekumar in pivotal roles. Mammootty appears in a cameo role. The film was the first production of Aashirvad Cinemas, owned by Antony Perumbavoor, the former chauffeur of Mohanlal.

Narasimham was released on 26 January 2000, India's 50th Republic Day, where the film ran for 200 days in theatres. The film was re-released under the name Narasimham Returns in 2014, which premiered in Dubai and was re-released in Kerala on several occasions, where it still enjoys a cult following. The film was remade in Telugu as Adhipathi (2001), starring Mohan Babu, Nagarjuna Akkineni, Preeti Jhangiani and Soundarya.

Plot 
Poovalli Induchoodan is the only son of idealistic High Court Justice Maranchery Karunakara Menon, who is sentenced to 6 years imprisonment for murdering his classmate. He later learns that the Home Minister, Manapally Madhavan Nambiar and his crony DYSP Sankaranarayanan had framed him to seek revenge on Justice Menon who had earlier given jail sentence to Manapally in a corruption case. Induchoodan, who had achieved rank in Civil exams loses the post and Manapally Sudheeran, Manappally's younger son enters the list of civil service trainees. 

It is later revealed that Ramakrishnan, who is the son of Mooppil Nair and Manappally's top supporters, was the real killer. After 6 years, Madhavan Nambiar, who is now a former state minister, is dead and Induchoodan is released from prison. Induchoodan thwarts Manapally Pavithran, Manappally's elder son from performing the funeral rituals of his father at the banks of Bharathapuzha. Many confrontations between Induchoodan and Manapally's henchmen begin. Justice Menon and his wife Sharada return to Kerala to stay with Induchoodan. A girl named Indulekha claims to be the daughter of Justice Menon. Menon flatly refuses the claim and banishes her. 

Forced by circumstances and at the instigation and help of Manapally Pavithran, she reluctantly comes out open with the parentage claim. At first, Induchoodan thrashes the protesters, but upon knowing the truth from his maternal uncle Chandrabhanu, he accepts the task of her protection as her elder brother. Induchoodan decides to marry Indulekha to his good friend Jayakrishnan where he confronts Justice Menon and prods him to accept the mistake and acknowledge the parentage of Indulekha. Menon ultimately regrets and secretly goes on to confess to his daughter. 

The next morning, Induchoodan returns to Poovally, where he learns that Indulekha is found dead and Menon is accused of murdering her. The whole act was planned by Pavithran, who after killing Indulekha forces Raman Nair (Menon's long time servant) to testify against Menon in court. In court, Nandagopal Marar, a close friend of Induchoodan and a Supreme Court lawyer, appears for Menon and manages to lay bare the murder plot and hidden intentions of the other party. Menon is proved innocent and is released. After confronting Pavithran and promising to avenge Indulekha's death, Induchoodan meets Justice Menon, who is remorseful for all his actions, including not believing in the innocence of Induchoodan.

While speaking to Induchoodan, Menon suffers a stroke and passes away. At Menon's funeral, Manapally Pavithran arrives to poke fun at Induchoodan and also tries to carry out the postponed last rituals of his own father. Induchoodan interrupts the ritual and avenges the death of Indulekha and Justice Menon by severely injuring Pavithran. On his way back to a peaceful life, Induchoodan accepts Anuradha, who is the robust and honest daughter of Mooppil Nair as his life partner.

Cast 

Mohanlal as Poovalli Induchoodan "Achuvettan" 
Thilakan as Justice Maranchery Karunakara Menon, Induchoodan's father
Mangalamkunnu Karnan
N. F. Varghese as Manappally Pavithran, the elder son of Nambiar
Jagathy Sreekumar as Chandrabhanu, Induchoodan's maternal uncle
Aishwariyaa Bhaskaran as Anuradha, Induchoodan's love interest (Voice over by Sreeja Ravi)
Kanaka as Indulekha, Menon's illegitimate daughter
Bharathi as Sharada, M. K. Menon's wife and Induchoodan's mother
Mammootty as Adv. Nandagopal Marar                              
Vijayakumar as Jayakrishnan, Induchoodan's jail mate friend
Kalabhavan Mani as Bharathan, Induchoodan's follower
Sadiq as Govindankutty, Induchoodan's friend
V. K. Sreeraman as Venu Master
Irshad as Gopalan, Induchoodan's friend
Maniyanpilla Raju as CI Habeeb, Induchoodan's friend
Narendra Prasad as Mooppil Nair, Ramakrishnan and Anuradha's father
Sai Kumar as SP Manappally Sudheeran IPS, Nambiar's younger son
E. A. Rajendran as Ramakrishnan
Spadikam George as Kalletti Vasudevan
Mohan Raj as Bhaskaran
Bheeman Raghu as DYSP Sankaranarayanan, Pavithran's devoted officer
T. P. Madhavan as Raman Nair, Menon's longtime clerk
Augustine as Eradi, district Panchayath President
Kuthiravattam Pappu as Indulekha's distant relative
Zeenath as Anuradha's mother
Kollam Ajith as Vasudevan
Kollam Thulasi as Public Prosecutor Gopinathan
Jagannatha Varma as Justice Pillai
Kozhikode Narayanan Nair as Manappally Madhavan Nambiar
Ponnamma Babu as Jayalakshmi teacher
Alphonsa as Item Dancer (special appearance)

Soundtrack

The film's original soundtrack includes five songs composed by M. G. Radhakrishnan and a total of eight tracks. Lyrics were by Gireesh Puthenchery. The soundtrack album was released by Satyam Audios. The song "Aarodum Onnum" featuring Mohanlal and Aishwarya is not included in the film's home video version.

Release 
Narasimham was released on 26 January 2000 on India's Republic Day. It was re-released on 5 December 2014 in Dubai after 15 years. The re-release was part of a special programme organised under the title Narasimham Returns on the occasion of celebrating the 15th anniversary of the film. It premiered at Golden Cinemas, Dubai. The premiere was attended by the major cast and crew of the film and subsequent screenings was received well by public. Later, it was released in Kerala.

In 2016, Narasimham Returns was re-released in seven districts in Kerala. The special screenings was held in Ernakulam, Alappuzha, Thrissur, Kottayam, Kannur, Pathanamthitta and Kollam on 26 January 2016.

Box office
The film was released in 32 centres in Kerala. The film completed 200 days in theatres. Producer's profits were estimated at 10 crore. Narasimham generated around 7 crore for the distributor's share. At the time, the film was the highest-grossing film in Malayalam cinema. The film also created history for screening with maximum number of additional shows for any Malayalam film, which took 16 years to surpass by Premam (2015). It is one of the highest rated films in the television.

It ran for more than 200 days in theatres.

Accolades
At the Asianet Film Awards, the film was awarded the Best Film and Shaji Kailas was adjudged the Best Director.

Legacy 
Mohanlal's punch dialogue in the film Nee Po Mone Dinesha has become an iconic Malayalam catchphrase. The Mundu worn by Mohanlal in this film, popularly known as Narasimham Mundu, became a fashion trend among youngsters. The film includes five songs composed by M. G. Radhakrishnan, of which Dhaankinakka/Pazhanimala and Mohanlal's introduction song attained a high level of popularity. The film was the 1000th acting credit of Jagathy Sreekumar.

References

External links 
 

2000s Malayalam-language films
2000 films
Malayalam films remade in other languages
Films scored by M. G. Radhakrishnan
Indian action drama films
Films directed by Shaji Kailas
2000 action films
Films shot in Ottapalam
Films shot at Varikkasseri Mana
Aashirvad Cinemas films